Ayaz Khan (born 1 April 1979) is an Indian actor and model. He is better known as Dr. Shubhankar Rai of Dill Mill Gayye on STAR One.

Career
He has appeared in such Hindi films as Jaane Tu... Ya Jaane Na. He played the character of Shubhankar Rai on the STAR One medical drama Dill Mill Gayye. In 2011, he appeared opposite Rahul Bose and Esha Deol in Ghost Ghost Na Raha and started in Apna Sa with Koyel Mullick. He is also part of the cast of Hide & Seek which was
released on 12 March 2010. Currently he is playing the role of Gaurav on Parichay on Colors TV.

Khan began working as a model in the late 1990s. He has appeared in over 300 print and television advertisements during his modelling career.

Filmography and TV shows

References

External links
 
 

Living people
21st-century Indian male actors
Indian male television actors
Indian male film actors
Indian male models
Male actors in Hindi cinema
Male actors from Mumbai
1979 births